Badrinath, alternatively spelled as Badrenath, is a 2011 Indian Telugu-language romantic action film directed by V. V. Vinayak, written by Chinni Krishna and produced by Allu Aravind. It stars Allu Arjun in the titular role along with Kelly Dorji, Prakash Raj and Tamannaah The film revolves around Badri, a skilled warrior trained by a religious Guru and martial arts expert Bheeshma Narayan. After being made the protector of Badrinath temple, Badri tries to revive the faith of Alakananda, an atheist woman who has fallen for him, in God and gets pitted against her cruel uncle Sarkar, while his Guru suspects him to be in love with Alakananda, something against the rules for becoming his successor. The film co-stars Ashwini Kalsekar, Rakesh Varre, Rao Ramesh and Pragathi.

Allu Arjun, who plays a modern-day Indian samurai, undertook intensive martial arts and sword fighting training in Vietnam. This film also marks his first pairing with Tamannaah. Cinematographer Ravi Varman in an interview told that the film was shot on a Panavision lens at a set in Kulaba on the way to the Rohtang pass apart from the Badrinath temple, on sets in Hyderabad and in Spain, Italy, Germany and Austria. Earlier, it was reported that the film would also have a dubbed version in Tamil with actor Santhanam's comedy scenes added, but the plan was dropped out due to the commercial failure of the Tamil dubbed versions of Telugu films Shakti and Magadheera.

Previously slated to release on 4 June 2011, the film along with a dubbed Malayalam version was released on 10 June 2011 in 1,400 screens worldwide and ran for 50 days in 187 theatres despite an unfavorable critical reception. Prem Rakshith won the Filmfare Award for Best Dance Choreographer for the film's song Nath Nath.

Plot
Religious guru and martial arts expert Bheeshma Narayan takes in Badri, a shepherd's son, and trains him into becoming an efficient warrior and the protector of Badrinath temple. He soon meets Alakananda, an agnostic woman whom he throws into the namesake river as a punishment for blowing a lamp at the temple, especially after he cured her ill grandfather. He rescues her after Bheeshma, convinced by her grandfather, orders him to. Alakananda is ordered to light 1 lakh lamps as punishment, which Badri convinces her to do with devotion. Her grandfather reveals she became an agnostic after watching her parents die in a temple fire, and grew up to become the object of hatred from the wife of Sarkar, a dreaded don. Since she wants to get Alakananda forcibly married to her son Nani as a form of revenge, Badri takes up the challenge to revive her faith in God. She falls for him after he performs Pind Daan for her parents. Later, Badri is summoned by Bheeshma to protect the Amarnath temple whose protector has been killed. After killing all the terrorists with his sword, Badri is introduced publicly by Bheeshma. Alakananda, whose faith in God has also been revived, meets Badri's parents who agree to their marriage, but are caught in a dilemma when Bheeshma tells them Badri has to remain celibate in order to succeed him. Alakananda is heartbroken, but Badri promises to unite her with her lover, not knowing it is him, by helping her offer a Brahma lotus, to retrieve which they travel into the mountains.

On the other hand, Sarkar's family learns about Badri from the Amarnath incident footage and send Nani to retrieve Alakananda after Badri dies. The gang attacks Badri and Alakananda as they race against time to reach the temple, but Badri guards her from them and allows her to enter the temple and make her wish. She demands Badri as her lover while Bheeshma demands him as his successor. In the meanwhile, Badri is distracted after Nani throws a statue into the river, which Badri retrieves after jumping into it and killing the henchmen. He is however stabbed by Nani upon reinstating the statue and is accused of being in love with Alakananda. This shocks Bheeshma, whose suspicion further grows as he watches Akakananda being taken away and Badri gaining consciousness to call out her name. The temple is closed temporarily for six months, during which Badri recuperates and Alakananda is engaged to Nani after Sarkar kills her grandfather. She writes a letter to Badri for help, which Bheeshma receives and tears apart but is found by Badri and replied with the same mountain soil he used to cure her grandfather. Sarkar and his family learn from a guru that the wedding is not destined to happen. Alakananda tries to escape along with her friend Razia, but is captured and only the latter escapes, convincing Badri to secretly go to Bellary and extract Alakananda. However, in his and Bheeshma's absence, Sarkar leads his henchmen to Badrinath and destroys the ashram, while Badri himself massacres the henchmen at Bellary railway station and impales Nani before rescuing Alakananda.

Seeing the ashram in ruins and realizing Badri took along his sword meant only for religious protection, an enraged Bheeshma orders Badri to vacate Badrinath after the latter arrives with Alakananda. She thanks God for freeing Badri from Bheeshma's clutches, but when Sarkar, his wife and henchmen arrive at Badrinath to kidnap Alakananda, Badri hands her over and reveals he only wanted to keep his promise and never had feelings for her but dedicated his life to his mentor instead. Bheeshma asks for Badri's apology and allows him to pray, before Alakananda reveals she loves none other than Badri, who is unfazed as she is being taken away. However, Bheeshma is moved by Alakananda's love for Badri and orders him to live for her. Badri kills the henchmen and defeats Sarkar after a knife duel, sparing him on the condition to never pursue Alakananda in the future. Badri and Alakananda are blessed by everyone at the temple, and before departing are asked by Bheeshma to hand over their future child for training.

Cast

 Allu Arjun as Badri
 Kelly Dorji as Sarkar
 Prakash Raj as Guru Bheeshma Narayana
 Tamannaah as Alakananda, Badri's love interest
 Ashwini Kalsekar as Sarkar's wife
 Rakesh Varre as Nani, Sarkar's son
 Bramhanandam as Batting Baba
 Pragathi as Razia, Alakananda's maid
 Tanikella Bharani as Badrinath's father
 Kovai Sarala as Badrinath's mother
 Sayaji Shinde as Alakananda's father
 M. S. Narayana as Chupke
 Rao Ramesh
 Master Bharath
 Sudha
 Geetha Singh
 Dharmavarapu Subrahmanyam
 Krishna Bhagavan
 Raghu Babu as Alakananda's caretaker
 Venu Madhav

Production 
Allu Arjun grew his hair out for his look as a warrior in the film.

Release

Certified A (adults only) by the Central Board of Film Certification on the account of graphic action violence, the film released theatrically along with its Malayalam dubbed version on 10 June 2011.

Home Video
Aditya Music released the film on DVD and Blu-ray formats.

Reception

Critical reception 
Noting it as a love story from a girl's point of view, Idlebrain.com gave the film 3 stars out of 5, praising Arjun, the music, cinematography, locations, art direction and production values. However, he felt the director failed to get the action and emotional aspects right, further noting the film's unfolding and narration were "not gripping". 123Telugu.com gave the film 2.5 stars out of 5, singling several sequences between Badri and Alakananda, performances, visuals, a comedy track and some of the action sequences for praise. However, the reviewer felt disappointed with the entire second half, criticizing the villain, a comedy scene involving conversation about Rajinikanth and Chiranjeevi, the random placement of songs and the climax. The reviewer also felt the railway station fight should have been banned due to excessively graphic violence.

The Times of India gave the film 2 stars out of 5, calling it a "disappointing ride". The reviewer found the love story against the temple backdrop unconvincing, action scenes artificial Bhatia's skin show unnecessary, music average and went on to state there was "not even a single interesting scene in the film". The reviewer, however, praised the art director Anand Sai for his work on recreating the Badrinath temple and other sets. Rediff.com responded more negatively with a 1.5/5 star rating, calling the plot unoriginal and feeling the romance was overshadowed by the action, cinematography and other aspects. More criticism was aimed at the randomly inserted songs and humor, while praise came towards the action sequences, technical aspects, art direction, production values and performances.

Box office 
It became the second highest Telugu grosser in Karnataka after Magadheera that time.

Soundtrack

The grand audio launching event of Badrinath was held at Shilpakala Vedika on 7 May 2011. Allu Arjun, Sneha Reddy, Tamannaah, V. V. Vinayak, Allu Aravind, his wife Nirmala, M. M. Keeravani, K. Raghavendra Rao, A. Kodandarami Reddy, K. S. Rama Rao, Chiranjeevi, his wife Mrs. Surekha, Srija, Sukumar, S. S. Rajamouli, Rama Rajamouli, Boyapati Srinu, B. V. S. N. Prasad, B. Gopal, Srinu Vaitla, Anand Sai, S. Gopala Reddy, Tagore Madhu, K. Atchi Reddy, Chandrabose, Chinni Krishna, Chaitanya Prasad, Pokuri Babu Rao, etc., were prominent figures in the audio function.

K. Raghavendra Rao and Chiranjeevi released the audio CDs and presented the first copy to S. S. Rajamouli and V. V. Vinayak. Allu Aravind released the trailers.

A reviewer from 123Telugu gave the soundtrack a positive review, praising Keeravani's attempt to create something different from Magadheera and describing the album as "unique, simple and entertaining".

Awards

59th Filmfare Awards South
Filmfare Award for Best Dance Choreographer – South – Prem Rakshith – "Nath Nath".
Nandi Award for Best Audiographer – K. Devi Krishna

TSR-TV9 Awards-2011
Best Hero – Allu Arjun

CineMAA Awards
Nominated – Best Actor – Allu Arjun

References

External links
 
 

2011 films
2010s Telugu-language films
2010s romantic action films
2011 martial arts films
Indian romantic action films
Films directed by V. V. Vinayak
Films scored by M. M. Keeravani
Geetha Arts films
Religious action films
Hindu devotional films
Films set in Uttarakhand
Films shot in Uttarakhand
Films shot in Himachal Pradesh
Films shot in Veneto
Films shot in Italy